Semen may refer to:
 Semen, the genital fluid also known as seminal fluid indicating fluid reabsorption in the pinocytotic vessels
 Semen (wasp), a wasp genus in the subfamily Encyrtinae
 Semen Gresik, the largest cement producing company in Indonesia
 Semen (name):
 Semen or Xemen, a medieval Basque and neighbour given name
 a popular Ukrainian given name (Семен)
 a romanization of Russian given names Семён (Semyon) or Симон (Simon)
 Semen Korsakov

See also 
 
 Seamen, the plural of seaman
 Semem Creek
 Semens, a commune in the Gironde department in southwestern France